Yindu District is a district of the city of Anyang, Henan province, China. The archeological site of Yinxu is located in Yindu District's Xijiao Township.

Administrative divisions
As 2012, this district is divided to 9 subdistricts and 1 township.
Subdistricts

Townships
Xijiao Township

References

County-level divisions of Henan
 
Anyang